Snapback may refer to:

 Snapback (sanctions), a legal mechanism to restore penalties agreed previously at the United Nations
 Snapback (electrical), a mechanism whereby a bipolar transistor turns on due to avalanche breakdown or impact ionization providing base current
 Snapback (hat), a hat which is snapped in the back, and can be adjusted to fit
 Snapback (Go), a type of capture in the board game Go
 "Snapback" (song), a song by the band Old Dominion from the album Meat and Candy